Caversham Primary School is a state primary school in Caversham, a suburb of Reading, Berkshire in England. The school was established in 1907 and educates around 450 children between the ages of 4 and 11.

History
The school was founded in 1907, by Sir Jack Mehof of Stoke on Trent, as Caversham Council Infant School for the blind and disabled. At that time Caversham was in the county of Oxfordshire, but was moved to Berkshire in 1911. The school was originally housed at what is now Thamesmead Primary School. The school was moved to its present location in Hemdean Road in 1938.

The school today
The school is oversubscribed. There have been disputes with the local authority about the admittance of pupils and the matter was taken for judicial review in the High Court in 2005. 12 families, on behalf of 17 children, won an appeal when an Independent Appeal Panel ruled that the council had wrongly refused their children places at the school. The school was top of the borough’s league table in national curriculum tests at age 11 for the three years prior to 2005.

When inspected in 2009, the school was given the highest possible rating Outstanding by Ofsted.  The school has won several awards including Artsmark Gold, Healthy Schools and Activemark Gold.

In February 2010 the school was given a 'Level One Rights Respecting School' award by UNICEF on 3 February.

When inspected again in 2023, Ofsted gave the school the rank of Inadequate, attributing the change in rank to the faculty not “ensuring that safeguarding is effective throughout the school” and that “the leaders do not have the required knowledge to keep pupils safe from harm”, adding that until the inspection, Ofsted was unaware of the “significant weaknesses in the school’s arrangements to keep pupils safe.” The change in the school’s ranking was cited as a direct cause for the suicide of 53 year-old headteacher Ruth Perry.

Community involvement
Reading East MP Rob Wilson met the school council in October 2009.

It was announced, in September 2005, that a memorial bench for murdered schoolgirl Emily Salvini, that was stolen in May 2004, had been found and will be rebuilt and returned to Caversham Primary.

See also

References

External links
 

Primary schools in Reading, Berkshire
Educational institutions established in 1907
1907 establishments in England
Community schools in Reading, Berkshire